DeDe, De De, Dedé or Dédé may refer to:

People

Nickname or stage name
 Dedé (Angolan footballer), born Adérito Waldemar Alves Carvalho
 Dedé (footballer, born 1978), Brazilian footballer born Leonardo de Deus Santos
 Dedé (footballer, born 1987), Brazilian footballer born Derivaldo Beserra Cavalcante
 Dedé (footballer, born 1988), Brazilian footballer born Anderson Vital da Silva
 Dede Allen (1923–2010), American film editor
 Dede Barry (born 1972), American cycle racer
 Dédé Fortin (1962–2000), Canadian musician
 DeDe Lattimore (born 1991), American football player
 DeDe Lind (born 1947), American model and Playboy Playmate of the Month
 Denise Lopez (Swedish singer), Mexican-born Swedish singer
 De De Pierce (1904–1973), American jazz trumpeter and cornetist 
 Dedé Santana (born 1936), Brazilian comedian
 Dede Westbrook (born 1993), American football player
 Dede Wilsey (born 1944), American philanthropist

Given name
 Dedé Anderson (born 1980), Brazilian footballer
 Dede Dolopei, Liberian civil servant
 DeDe Dorsey (born 1984), American football player
 Dede Feldman (born 1947), American politician 
 Dede Koswara, Indonesian man known as "Treeman"
 Dédé Saint Prix (born 1953), Martinican singer

Pseudonym
 Dede (artist), Israeli graffiti artist

Surname
 Ahmet Kayhan Dede, Turkish Sufi master
 Çiğdem Dede (born 1980), Turkish paralympic powerlifter
 Edmond Dédé, American musician
 Hammamizade İsmail Dede Efendi (1778–1846), Turkish composer
 Klaus Dede (born 1935), German writer and journalist
 Mercan Dede (born 1966), Turkish composer and musician
 Munejjim-bashi Ahmed Dede, Turkish astronomer

Entertainment and culture
 Dédé (opérette), a 1921 operetta by Henri Christiné
 Dédé (1935 film), French comedy film directed by René Guissart
 Dédé (1989 film), a French film by Jean-Louis Benoît
 Dede (2017 film), a Georgian film by Mariam Khatchvani
 Dede Franklin, a Prison Break character
 the title character of the Book of Dede Korkut, an epic story of the Oghuz Turks
 Dede (band), American dream pop/post-rock band

Other
 Dede (religious figure), in Alevi or Bektashi
Dede (restaurant), in Baltimore, Ireland

See also
Deedee
 Deede (disambiguation)
 Dedee, a nickname
 Dedede, a character in the Kirby video game franchise
 DD (disambiguation)
 Didi (disambiguation)

English feminine given names
Turkish-language surnames
Turkish masculine given names
Lists of people by nickname
Hypocorisms